= Courtney White =

Courtney White is an American author and archeologist. He is the founder of the Quivira Coalition, a nonprofit organization devoted towards making the ranching industry more environmentally resilient and sustainable.

== Books ==
- Two Percent Solutions for the Planet: 50 Low-Cost, Low-Tech, Nature-Based Practices for Combating Hunger, Drought and Climate Change
- The Age of Consequences: a Chronicle of Concern and Hope
- Grass, Soil, Hope: a Journey through Carbon Country
- Revolution on the Range: the Rise of a New Ranch in the American West
- Grassroots: The Rise of the Radical Center
